Oberon Correctional Centre is an Australian minimum security prison for young male offenders located in Gurnang,  from Oberon, New South Wales. The centre is operated by Corrective Services NSW an agency of the Department of Attorney General and Justice of the Government of New South Wales. The centre detains sentenced offenders under New South Wales and/or Commonwealth legislation.

The centre caters for one of the final stages of the Corrective Services Young Offenders Program, which attempts to separate younger inmates from older, hardened inmates, and prepares them for eventual release.

See also

Punishment in Australia

References

External links
 Oberon Correctional Centre website

Prisons in New South Wales
Oberon Council